List of speakers of the Løgting of the Faroe Islands. Speaker is the presiding office in Løgting.

Below is a list of office-holders:

References

See also
Politics of the Faroe Islands

Main
Speakers of the Logting of the Faroe Islands
Faroes